Jukhia is a  village and a gram panchayat in the Bhagabanpur II CD block in the Contai subdivision of the Purba Medinipur district in the state of West Bengal, India.

Geography

Location

Urbanisation
93.55% of the population of Contai subdivision live in the rural areas. Only 6.45% of the population live in the urban areas and it is considerably behind Haldia subdivision in urbanization, where 20.81% of the population live in urban areas.

Note: The map alongside presents some of the notable locations in the subdivision. All places marked in the map are linked in the larger full screen map.

Demographics
According to the 2011 Census of India, Jukhia had a total population of 4,291, of which 2,226 (52%) were males and 2,065 (48%) were females. There were 462 persons in the age range of 0–6 years. The total number of literate persons in Jukhia was 3,524 (92.03% of the population over 6 years).

Education
The nearest college, Mugberia Gangadhar Mahavidyalaya at Mugberia, near Bhupatinagar was established in 1964. In addition to the courses in arts, science and commerce, it offers degree and post-graduate courses in physical education.

Culture
David J. McCutchion mentions the Radha-Govinda temple as a West Bengal navaratna temple with turrets having curved ridging, measuring 31’ 6” square, and having been built in 1891–1901, rebuilt reincorporating terracotta carvings. The place is mentioned as Dheloa, possibly a neighbouring village with a similar name.

Jukhia picture gallery

Healthcare
Bhupatinagar Mugberia Rural Hospital at Bhupatinagar (with 30 beds) is the major government medical facility in Bhagabanpur II CD block

References

External links

Villages in Purba Medinipur district